Doanville is an unincorporated community in Athens County, in the U.S. state of Ohio.

History
A post office called Doanville was established in 1901, and remained in operation until 1966. Besides the post office, Doanville had a country store.

References

Unincorporated communities in Athens County, Ohio
1901 establishments in Ohio
Unincorporated communities in Ohio